Terrell Hills is a city in Bexar County, Texas, United States; it is located  northeast of downtown San Antonio. As of the 2020 census Terrell Hills had a population of 5,045. It is part of a group of three cities—Terrell Hills, Alamo Heights, and Olmos Park—located between Uptown San Antonio, Midtown San Antonio, Downtown San Antonio, and Fort Sam Houston (a U.S. Army post). Terrell Hills is bordered on the west by Alamo Heights, on the east by Fort Sam Houston, on the north by Uptown San Antonio, and on the south by San Antonio's Near East Side. It is part of the San Antonio Metropolitan Statistical Area.

The community is named after Frederick Terrell, a local bank president who had served as mayor of San Antonio in 1901. Development of the community began in 1919, when Terrell sold  of property to a private association called the Terrell Hills Community. This organization managed the community until 1939, when it incorporated as a municipality. In 1945, the City of San Antonio attempted to annex the new municipality without permitting an election in either Terrell Hills or San Antonio, but Terrell Hills successfully sued to block the annexation.

Geography

Demographics

As of the 2020 United States census, there were 5,045 people, 1,695 households, and 1,314 families residing in the city.

As of the census of 2000, the city had a resident population of 5,019 persons, with a corresponding population density of 1,167.4/km2 (3,032.6/sq mi). Of this population, 95.40% identified themselves as White, 0.52% as African American, 0.16% as Native American, 0.22% as Asian, 0.02% as Pacific Islander, 2.39% as "some other race", and 1.30% as belonging to two or more races. In addition, 11.68% of the population identified themselves as being of Hispanic, Latino, or Spanish origin of any race.

There were a total of 2,011 housing units in the city, 1,913 of which were occupied and consequently counted as census households; the city had no group quarters. Of these 1,913 households, 1,410 (73.7%) were classified as family households; 36.6% of these families included the householder's own minor children (that is, children less than 18 years old). Of the total households, 32.6% were married-couple families with their own minor children, 31.9% were married-couple families without their own minor children, 3.8% were families headed by a female householder with no husband present but with the householder's own minor children present, and 3.4% were families headed by a female householder with only relatives other than her husband or minor children present. Finally, 12.3% of households consisted of a single individual living alone of more than 65 years of age and 10.4% of a single individual living alone of less than 65 years of age; 3.6% were other non-family households. The average household size was 2.62 persons and the average family size was 3.09 persons.

Persons under 18 years of age comprised 28.2% of the city's population; those aged 18 to 24, 3.7%; 25 to 44, 25.0%; 45 to 64, 26.1%; and those over 65 years of age, 17.1%. The median age was 42 years. Out of all age groups, there were 88.3 males for every 100 females; out of all those of at least 18 years of age, there were 85.7 males for every 100 females.

The median household income for the city was $79,295, and the median family income was $86,636. The median income for individual male year-round workers was $61,743; for like females, it was $40,956. Per capita income was $45,134. The Census Bureau classified 4.7% of the city's population, and 3.2% of its families, as living below the poverty line. In terms of age, 6.1% of those under the age of 18 and 2.4% of those over the age of 65 were living below the poverty line. The median home price in 2005 in Terrell Hills was $583,500.

Notable people

 Christopher Cross, Grammy winning singer-songwriter
 Tommy Lee Jones, 1994 Academy Award-winning actor

Education

Most residents are zoned to the Alamo Heights Independent School District. Howard Early Childhood Center in San Antonio, Woodridge Elementary School in San Antonio, Alamo Heights Junior High School in San Antonio, and Alamo Heights High School in Alamo Heights serve Terrell Hills.

A small portion of Terrell Hills is served by the North East Independent School District. The portion is served by Wilshire Elementary School, Garner Middle School, and MacArthur High School, all in San Antonio.

References

External links

 City of Terrell Hills official website
 A Guide to the City of Terrell Hills, Texas Records, University of Texas at San Antonio Libraries (UTSA Libraries) Special Collections.

Cities in Texas
Cities in Bexar County, Texas
Greater San Antonio
Populated places established in 1919